Ermengarde (Occitan: Ermengarda, Ainermada, or Ainemarda) (b. 1127 or 1129 – d. Perpignan, 14 October 1197), was a viscountess of Narbonne from 1134 to 1192. She was the daughter of Aimery II of Narbonne and his first wife, also named Ermengarde.

Youth
Aimery II was killed at the Battle of Fraga on July 17, 1134, fighting against the Almoravids along with Alfonso I of Aragon. Aimery left only two underaged daughters as his heirs, Ermengarde and her half-sister Ermessinde (daughter of Aimery's second wife, also named Ermessinde). Aimery had at least one son, also called Aimery, attested in numerous charters, but he predeceased him (ca. 1130). Thus, the approximately five-year-old Ermengarde inherited the viscounty of Narbonne, which occupied a strategic place in the politics of Languedoc: it was desired by the counts of Toulouse, the counts of Barcelona, the Trencavel viscounts of Carcassonne, and the lords of Montpellier. 

In 1142, Alfonso Jordan, count of Toulouse, whose wife Faydid of Uzes had either recently died or been repudiated, married the now-adolescent Ermengarde. In reaction to this prospect, which overturned the balance of power in the region by adding Narbonne to the direct control of Toulouse, a coalition of Occitan lords led by Roger II of Béziers, viscount of Carcassonne, Béziers, Albi and Razès formed an alliance against Toulouse. Alfonso was defeated by the coalition and taken prisoner, and was forced to make peace with Narbonne and restore Ermengarde and her new husband to the viscounty before being released. Following the dissolution of her marriage to Alfonso, Ermengarde was married to a vassal of Roger II, Bernard IV of Anduze.

Political activity
In 1177 she joined Gui Guerrejat (the lover of Azalais de Porcairagues), Bernard Ato V of Nîmes and Agde, and Gui's nephews William VIII of Montpellier and Gui Burgundion, in an alliance in opposition to Raymond VI of Toulouse, whose power suddenly increased when he became ruler of Melgueil as widower of Ermessende of Pelet.

Cultural activity
Around 1190, a French cleric named André le Chapelain wrote a "Treatise on Courtly Love" (Latin De Arte honeste amandi). In the second part of the Treatise, "How to maintain love", the author spoke of twenty-one "judgements of love" which had been pronounced by the greatest ladies of the kingdom of France. Among them, three judgements were attributed to Eleanor of Aquitaine, seven to her daughter Marie, and five to Ermengarde. Although these "judgements" were probably fictional, they attest to the fame acquired by Ermengarde, even in the langue d'oïl in the north. She corresponded with many troubadours, including Peire Rogier, Giraut de Bornelh, Peire d'Alvergne, Pons d'Ortafa, and Salh d'Escola, as well as the trobairitz Azalais de Porcairagues.

In addition it is believed that she welcomed to her court Rognvald II of Orkney, a Viking prince that became a saint, and poet, who composed skaldic poetry for her.

Later years
Without issue after two unhappy marriages, Ermengarde designated as heir Pedro Manrique de Lara -the second but eldest surviving son of her half-sister Ermessinde (who had died in 1177) by her husband, Count Manrique Pérez de Lara (who was killed in battle in Garcianarro on 9 July 1164). In 1192 Ermengarde abdicated the viscounty in favor of Peter and retired to Perpignan, where she died five years later.

Notes

Sources
 
 Jacqueline Caille, Medieval Narbonne: A City at the Heart of the Troubadour World, Ashgate, Variorum Collected Studies Series, 2005.

External links
 André le Chapelain and the Treatise on Courtly Love (French)
 Commercial treaty between Genoa et Narbonne (November 12, 1166) (in Latin)
 Testament of Ermengarde (April 30, 1196) (in Latin)

1120s births
1190s deaths
Occitan nobility
French patrons of literature
Viscounts of Narbonne
12th-century French people
12th-century women rulers
12th-century French women